Moggridgea terrestris is a spider species in the genus Moggridgea. It is found in South Africa.

See also
 List of Migidae species

References

Endemic fauna of South Africa
Migidae
Spiders of South Africa
Spiders described in 1914